Klyuchevoy Log (Şişmälequl) is a rural locality (a selo) in Kungakovsky Selsoviet, Askinsky District, Bashkortostan, Russia. The population was 29 as of 2010. There is 1 street.

Geography 
Klyuchevoy Log is located 53 km northeast of Askino (the district's administrative centre) by road. Tashlykul is the nearest rural locality.

References 

Geomagnetic activity in Klyuchevoy 

Rural localities in Askinsky District